Yuri Adriano Santos (born 27 April 1984), commonly known as Yuri, is a retired Brazilian footballer.

Career statistics

Club

Notes

References

1984 births
Living people
Brazilian footballers
Association football goalkeepers
Esporte Clube Taubaté players
Esporte Clube São Bento players
Esporte Clube XV de Novembro (Jaú) players
Marília Atlético Clube players
Esporte Clube Noroeste players
Grêmio Novorizontino players
Mirassol Futebol Clube players
People from Osasco
Footballers from São Paulo (state)